Here in the Real World is the debut studio album by American country music artist Alan Jackson. It was released on February 27, 1990, and produced five singles: "Blue Blooded Woman", "Here in the Real World", "Wanted", "Chasin' That Neon Rainbow", and "I'd Love You All Over Again", Jackson's first No. 1 hit.

The track "Home" served as the B-side for several of Jackson's later singles, before he re-released the song in 1995 for his The Greatest Hits Collection album, and finally issued it as a single in 1996. The track "Ace of Hearts" was later recorded by Mark Wills for his self-titled debut album in 1996.

Track listing

Personnel
 Alan Jackson – lead vocals, backing vocals
 Eddie Bayers – drums
 Harold Bradley – six-string bass guitar
 Jimmy Capps – acoustic guitar
 Paul Franklin – steel guitar
 Steve Gibson – electric guitar
 Rob Hajacos – fiddle
 Dennis Henson – backing vocals 
 Roy Huskey Jr. – upright bass
 Brent Mason – electric guitar
 Weldon Myrick – steel guitar
 Larry Paxton – bass guitar
 Dave Pomeroy – bass guitar 
 Hargus "Pig" Robbins – piano
 Keith Stegall – backing vocals
 Bruce Watkins – acoustic guitar

Chart performance
Here in the Real World peaked at #54 on the U.S. Billboard 200 and #4 on the Top Country Albums. In August 1994, Here in the Real World was certified 2× Platinum by the RIAA.

Weekly charts

Year-end charts

Sales and Certifications

References

1990 debut albums
Alan Jackson albums
Arista Records albums
Albums produced by Scott Hendricks
Albums produced by Keith Stegall